Egeli is a surname. Notable people with the surname include:

Bjorn Egeli (1900–1984), Norwegian-born American painter
Lene Egeli (born 1987), Norwegian beauty pageant contestant and model 
Peter Egeli (born 1934), American painter, son of Bjorn